The Fighting Cowboy is a 1933 American Western film directed by Victor Adamson and starring Jay Wilsey, Genee Boutell and Allen Holbrook.

Cast
 Jay Wilsey as Bill Carson 
 Genee Boutell as Lizabeth Horton 
 Allen Holbrook as Duke Neill 
 William Ryno as Cash Horton 
 Marin Sais as Squaw Mary 
 Tom Palky as Bugs 
 Bartlett A. Carre as Pete Quimby 
 Jack Evans as Buck 
 William Barrymore as Red 
 Ken Broeker as Sheriff 
 Betty Butler as Duke's Girl 
 Hamilton Steele as Storekeeper 
 Clyde McClary as Irishman 
 Ernest Scott as Desert Rat 
 Bud Baxter as Deputy Sheriff

References

Bibliography
 Michael R. Pitts. Poverty Row Studios, 1929–1940: An Illustrated History of 55 Independent Film Companies, with a Filmography for Each. McFarland & Company, 2005.

External links
 

1933 films
1933 Western (genre) films
American Western (genre) films
Films directed by Victor Adamson
1930s English-language films
1930s American films